Pseudancistrus nigrescens is a species of catfish in the family Loricariidae. It is native to South America, where it occurs in the upper Potaro River basin in Guyana. The species reaches 18.2 cm (7.2 inches) in total length.

P. nigrescens sometimes appears in the aquarium trade, where it is typically referred to either as the headspotted stream pleco or by its associated L-number, which is L-299.

References 

Loricariidae
Fish described in 1912
Catfish of South America
Fish of Guyana